Igaraçu do Tietê is a municipality in the state of São Paulo in Brazil. The population is 24,749 (2020 est.) in an area of 97.7 km². The elevation is 498 m.

References

Municipalities in São Paulo (state)